The diamonds affair, known in France as "l'affaire des diamants", was a major political scandal in the 5th French Republic. In 1973, the Minister of Finance, future president Valéry Giscard d'Estaing, was offered two diamonds from the President of the Central African Republic, the notorious dictator Jean-Bédel Bokassa. The affair was unveiled by the satiric newspaper Le Canard Enchaîné on October 10, 1979, towards the end of Giscard's presidency.

In order to defend himself, Giscard d'Estaing claimed to have sold the diamonds and donated the proceeds to the Central African Red Cross. He expected CAR authorities to confirm the story. However, the head of the local Red Cross society, Jeanne-Marie Ruth-Rolland, publicly denied the French claims. Ruth-Rolland was quickly dismissed from her post in what she described as a "coup de force" by Dacko.

The saga contributed to Giscard losing his 1981 reelection bid.

References
 
 
 
 
 
 </ref>

Political scandals in France
Politics of France
Diplomatic gifts
Valéry Giscard d'Estaing